Trokhizbenka is a village in Shchastia Raion (district) in Luhansk Oblast of eastern Ukraine, at about 25 km NW from the centre of Luhansk city, on the left bank of the Siverskyi Donets.

History
The settlement was founded by the Don Cossacks in the first half of the 17th century.

War in Donbas
The village was occupied by pro-Russian troops in the spring of 2014. On 11 July 2014 Ukrainian troops took the village under their control and set up a checkpoint near the bridge over the river. The bridge was blown up on 3 September 2014.
The war has brought along both civilian and military casualties. With the beginning of the Russian offensive on Ukraine (2022), the city quickly fell into the hands of the invaders and was captured by Russian troops at the beginning of the offensive itself.

Demographics
Native language as of the Ukrainian Census of 2001:
 Russian 98.49%
Ukrainian 1.44%

References

External links
 Weather forecast for Trokhizbenka
Starobelsky Uyezd

Villages in Shchastia Raion
Populated places established in 1674